Eduardo da Costa Paes (born 14 November 1969) is a Brazilian politician who was the mayor of the city of Rio de Janeiro from 2009 to 2012, re-elected for a second term from 2013 to 2016 and returning elected again in 2021. He is currently the 13th mayor of Rio de Janeiro. On 12 August 2012, at the 2012 Summer Olympics closing ceremony, Paes received the Olympic Flag, via Jacques Rogge, from London Mayor Boris Johnson.

Paes was a noted trenchant critic of the Lula administration, particularly during the Mensalão scandal in 2005 over alleged payments to congressmen for votes. When it came to his administration as Rio de Janeiro's mayor, scandals continued to occur.

As mayor during the bid, preparation and execution of the 2016 Summer Olympics in Rio, Paes faced many challenges, balancing the demands and opportunities of the Olympics with the needs of the Cariocas (the people of Rio de Janeiro).

Paes ran unsuccessfully for Rio de Janeiro state governor in 2018. He was elected for a third term as Rio de Janeiro mayor in 2020, defeating incumbent Marcelo Crivella in the run-off.

In 2021, even though being elected mayor by the party Democrats (DEM), Paes was successfully affiliated to the Democratic Social Party (PSD), starting a movement for other politicians connected to the mayor to affiliate themselves to the party.

Personal life

Paes is married to Cristine and has two children. He is Roman Catholic.

References

External links 

 

|-

|-

|-

|-

|-

1969 births
Living people
Mayors of Rio de Janeiro (city)
Pontifical Catholic University of Rio de Janeiro alumni
Members of the Chamber of Deputies (Brazil) from Rio de Janeiro (state)
Green Party (Brazil) politicians
Brazilian Labour Party (current) politicians
Brazilian Social Democracy Party politicians
Brazilian Democratic Movement politicians
Democrats (Brazil) politicians
Brazilian Roman Catholics